The 1999 Kyalami Superbike World Championship round was the opening round of the 1999 Superbike World Championship season and the 1999 Supersport World Championship season. It took place on the weekend of 26–28 March 1999 at the 4.26 km Kyalami Circuit in South Africa. The round was marred by the death of Brett MacLeod after a crash in the Supersport race.

Superbike

Entry list

Race 1

Summary 

Carl Fogarty got the holeshot from pole position and led Corser and Haga into the first corner. Doriano Romboni made a strong start, but dropped back due to the pain of his injured hand. Aprilia's World Superbike debut lasted less than 3 laps, after Peter Goddard dropped it at the chicane. The field became spread out by lap 5, with Fogarty 3 seconds ahead of team-mate Corser, who was battling with Slight for second. Ducati riders Lucio Pedercini and Carlos Macias both crashed out on lap 16. After 25 laps, Carl Fogarty won his 49th World Superbike race, ahead of Corser, Slight, Haga and Edwards. The Kawasakis of Yanagawa and Lavilla suffered tyre, suspension and power difficulties but managed sixth and eighth respectively, with Chili between them in seventh.

Classification

Race 2

Classification

Supersport

Race

Classification

References 

Kyalami
Superbike World Championship round